Morphine is a potent opiate analgesic drug.

Morphine may also refer to:

 Morphine (band), an American alternative rock band
 Morphine (film), a 2008 Russian film by Aleksei Balabanov
 "Morphine", a song by Kish Mauve from Black Heart
 "Morphine", a song by Michael Jackson from Blood on the Dance Floor: HIStory in the Mix

See also 
 Morpheus (disambiguation)
 Morphia (disambiguation)